Help Yourself is the fourth studio album by singer-songwriter Julian Lennon.

Release

It was released in August 1991, on Atlantic Records in the US and on Virgin Records in the UK. The album was a commercial success in Europe for Lennon, spawning a UK No. 6 hit "Saltwater" (as well as topping the charts in Australia for four weeks); however, it did not do as well in the US, where Atlantic Records were said to have under-promoted the album.

The album features uncredited guitar contributions from George Harrison (disputed).

The album was reissued, along with The Secret Value of Daydreaming and Mr. Jordan, on 8 September 2009 by Noble Rot Records.

Track listing 
Side one
 "Rebel King" (Julian Lennon, Anthony Moore, Bob Ezrin) – 5:51
 "Saltwater" (Lennon, Mark Spiro, Leslie Spiro) – 4:07
 "Get a Life" (Lennon, Glenn Martin Tilbrook, Scott Humphrey) – 4:17
 "Would You" (Lennon, Moore) – 6:19
 "Maybe I Was Wrong" (Lennon, Justin Clayton) – 4:27
 "Help Yourself" (Lennon, John McCurry) – 4:41

Side two 
 "Listen" (Lennon) – 5:04
 "Other Side of Town" (Lennon, Paul Buchanan, Robert Bell) – 5:34
 "New Physics Rant" (Lennon, Moore, Ezrin, Humphrey) – 4:48
 "Take Me Home" (Lennon, Ezrin, Clayton) – 4:26
 "Imaginary Lines" (Lennon, Moore, Clayton, Ezrin) – 5:12
 "Keep the People Working" (Moore) – 3:36

Personnel

Musicians 
 Julian Lennon – lead and backing vocals, keyboards, guitar, mandolin, bass and drum programming, percussion
 Bob Ezrin – keyboards, programming, percussion, backing vocals 
 Scott Humphrey – keyboards, synthesizer programming, computer programming, backing vocals 
 John Haeny – sound effects
 Justin Clayton – guitar
 Steve Hunter – guitar
 John McCurry – guitar
 George Harrison – guitar [uncredited, disputed]
 Matt Bissonette – bass guitar 
 Louis Molino – drums
 Allan Schwartzberg – additional drums
 Bobbye Hall – percussion
 Paul Buchanan – lead vocals (8)
 Maxi Anderson – backing vocals
 Kim Edwards-Brown – backing vocals
 Peter Fletcher – backing vocals
 Clydene Jackson – backing vocals
 Bobette Jamison-Harrison – backing vocals
 Carmen Twillie – backing vocals
 Clarise Wilkins – backing vocals
 Paul Winger – backing vocals
 Olivia D'Abo – additional backing vocals 
 Mark Spiro – additional backing vocals 
 San Fernando Valley Girl Scout Troop 592 – additional backing vocals

Production 
 Bob Ezrin – producer 
 Lenny Derose – recording 
 James Guthrie – mixing
 Martin Horenburg – recording assistant, mix assistant 
 Marko Olson – recording assistant
 Robert Hrycyna – production supervisor, technical supervisor 
 Doug Sax – mastering 
 PhD – art direction, design 
 Mark Hanauer – photography 
 Tony Smith – management 
 Paddy Spinks – management

Studios
 Recorded at The Enterprise (Burbank, California) and Amigo Studios (North Hollywood, California).
 Mixed at The Enterprise
 Mastered at The Mastering Lab (Hollywood, California).

Charts

Weekly charts

Certifications

Notes 

1991 albums
Julian Lennon albums
Albums produced by Bob Ezrin
Atlantic Records albums
Virgin Records albums